The Robert C. Vance Distinguished Lecture Series was a series of 23 lectures between 1983 and 2013 at Central Connecticut State University. Most of the speakers were either well-known journalists such as Anderson Cooper, Dan Rather, and Bob Woodward), or government figures, including Robert Gates, Rudolph Giuliani, and Shimon Peres. Three former U.S. Presidents have also been among the lecturers in the series.

The lecture series was named in honor of Robert C. Vance, publisher of the New Britain Herald from 1951 to 1959.

The original aim of the series was to bring to CCSU speakers from the field of journalism. Newscaster David Brinkley was scheduled to give the first Vance lecture in 1983, but was replaced only days before the lecture by Benjamin Bradlee., The twelve lecturers following Bradlee were well-known political figures, but since 2001, journalists have also been featured.

All costs for the series were covered by the Robert C. Vance Charitable Foundation, a private foundation founded in 1958. Lectures were free to the public, although in later years a paid reception and dinner with the lecturer was usually held before the lecture.

Discontinuation
After the Rudolph Giuliani lecture in March 2013, the university's Faculty Senate, having  “expressed its dissatisfaction with the lack of progressive speakers over the past few years,” created an ad hoc committee to recommend future speakers. However, the university and the Vance Foundation could not reach consensus on a speaker for 2014. The ad hoc committee submitted a list of potential speakers the following term, but again, no consensus was reached.

The university issued a news release dated December 9, 2015, stating that “The Robert C. Vance Lecture Series will be discontinued.” Although no reason was given for ending the series, it was noted that funding for the series had not been discontinued, and that these monies “will be redirected to the [Vance] Endowed Chair [in Journalism and Mass Communication] in support of critical initiatives that will have a more direct impact on CCSU students, faculty members, as well as the larger New Britain community.”

List of Vance Lecturers
The following twenty-four speakers gave lectures in this series. There were twenty-three events, as William F. Buckley, Jr. and George McGovern appeared together in 1990. Former President of Ireland Mary Robinson is among the speakers the Vance Foundation has been unsuccessful in booking.

Notes

a speaker received an Honorary degree from CCSU on the date of his or her lecture.

Controversies
The Vance Lecture Series has been accused of conservative bias by members of the CCSU community.
Eighteen of the 24 speakers have been government officials or political figures. Of the U.S. officials, three have been Democrats (Carter, McGovern, and Mitchell)  and nine have been Republicans (Kissinger, Buckley, Ford, Kirkpatrick, Bush, Dole, Forbes, Gates, and Giuliani). The six foreign heads of government were evenly split on ideology (Wilson, Schmidt, and Peres represented left-center parties, while Mulroney, Wałęsa, and de Klerk were members of right-center parties).
Five of the speakers represented the news media, which is routinely accused of liberal bias. Hugh Downs is generally viewed as a libertarian, while Woodward's ideology has been debated.,, Based on reputation, Bradlee, Cooper, and Rather are liberals.
In his Vero Beach Newsweekly articles, the remaining speaker, former Baseball commissioner Fay Vincent, occasionally offers moderately conservative views,  but is generally nonpolitical.
In particular, the lectures of Kissinger, de Klerk, and Gates were met with protests.

References

Central Connecticut State University
Connecticut State University System
Lecture series
1983 establishments in Connecticut
2015 disestablishments in Connecticut